Moradabad (also Romanized as Morādābād; also known as Murādābād) is a village in Esmaili Rural District, Esmaili District, Anbarabad County, Kerman Province, Iran. At the 2006 census, its population was 731, in 159 families.

References 

Populated places in Anbarabad County